Tomb of Munmu of Silla is an underwater tomb, the 30th king of Silla, in Gyeongju, North Gyeongsang Province, South Korea. This is Historic Site No. 158, also known as Daewang-am.

Location 
The tomb of Munmu of Silla is located in 26, Bonggil-ri, Yangbuk-myeon, Gyeongju, North Gyeongsang Province. It is located 200 meters off the coast of Bonggil-ri in Yangbuk-myeon.

Appearance 
It is the only underwater tomb in the world. It looks like normal rocks from a distance. There is a smaller rock to the south. The area is surrounded by small rocks that are only seen at low tide intervals, making them look like stone beams. It is owned by the Gyeongju National Museum. The monument collapsed early, and two large sections and one small stone were discovered so far, but one stone is not handed over. The stone is a reddish-brown igneous rock with a maximum height of 52 cm, 64 cm wide and 24 cm thick, and the small section is carved with a 2-legged triangle.'

Underwater tomb 
The tomb of Munmu of Silla is located on the sea. To see the tomb, one must go to a rare and mysterious tomb built between small rocks in the middle of the sea. Although the tomb of Munmu of Silla looks like a small rocky island from a distance, it is located on the rock, and it is like a pond in the middle. The rock is built at regular intervals like a pillar, and a large building looks like a turtle. Water flows in and out of the pond in all directions, as the waters that flow in and out of the lake slowly turn around and out to the west. It is believed that the Silla people artificially refined the royal tomb of Munmu of Silla.

History

Silla Dynasty 
Munmu of Silla' unified the Three Kingdoms of Korea, but he was worried about the safety of unstable countries and the invasion of Japan. When Japan broke out on the Sea of Korea and killed and pillaged the people, 'Munmu of Silla' began to build temples while increasing military and defense facilities on the east coast. The idea was to defeat the Japanese people with the help of Buddha. But before the temple was finished, 'Munmu of Silla' became ill. 'Munmu of Silla' called his son before his death. "If I die, Bury me in Donghae (Sea of Korea). It is called , and it is the Tomb of Munmu of Silla. In this way, 'Munmu of Silla' will become a great dragon and protect the country. When 'Munmu of Silla' died before completing the temple, his son King Sinmun completed it in 682. And he named it "  "  to thank 'Munmu of Silla's grace.

Cho geung-seop(조긍섭), who toured Gyeongju from 1918 to 1926 during Korea under Japanese rule, wrote a poem using the tomb of Munmu of Silla. In his poem, Munmu of Silla instructed him to cremate in the Sea of Korea with dying words. People suspected he might have designated such a big tomb. However, people guess that the cremate might have caused him to bury his bones and become a big tomb. He will not get a place like this without great virtue.

A tale of Manpasikjeok 
Sinmun of Silla built  for his father, Munmu of Silla. In 682, a public official said 'Small mountain in Donghae is coming to Gameunsa'. According to the fortune-telling, King Munmu of Silla, who became the dragon of the sea, and Gim Yu-sin, who became the king of heaven, said, " Go out and take the present." Nine days after the storm, the king entered the mountain and the dragon said, "If you made a flute out of that bamboo, the whole world would be at ease." So he took it out, made a flute and kept it. The name of this flute is Manpasikjeok. The reason for the name is that when the country is worried, he played the flute and country has become quiet.

Tombstone 
Unlike most royal tombs, Munmu of Silla's tombstone could not be placed in front of them. He was buried in rocks of the Donghae. It is assumed that Munmu of Silla's tombstone was built at Sacheonwang Temple, a place that was closely related to Munmu of Silla's life. Based on the excavation research, the two royal tombs are believed to be Sacheonwang Temple Historical Hall and Munmu of Silla's Royal Palace. Sacheonwang Temple also appears on the side of Gyeongmyeong of Silla of Samguk sagi, which appears to have been maintained until silla collapsed.

However, with the fall of Silla, Munmu of Silla's tombstone has become unknown. However, the existence was confirmed by Hong Yang-ho, then a member of the Gyeongju Buyun, in 1760, and was reconfirmed by Chusa Gim Jeong-hui, who visited Gyeongju in 1817. The lower part of tombstone was discovered in 1961, and the higher part of tombstone was discovered by a gas inspector when it was used as a laundry stone in a house in eastern Gyeongju in 2009.

2017 
In 2017, the tomb of Munmu of Silla was selected 'the top 10 tourist contents of North Gyeongsang Province'.

Festival

Chunhyang Daeje 
in Tomb of Munmu of Silla  means commemorative rites for ancestors in early spring. The festival is held to inherit the spirit of national defense, to celebrate the king and attract tourists, organized by residents. More than 900 people participated, including heads of government, citizens, and tourists.

Sunrise festival 
Every New Year's Day, Gyeongju hold the sunrise festival at the tomb of King Munmu of Silla. The sunrise festival, which was held in 2015, was called 'The sunrise festival of tomb of King Munmu of Silla in Gyeongju'

King Munmu culture festival 
The city of gyeongju held various traditional cultural events in front of the tomb of King Munmu of Silla in honor of the great king Munmu. On the first day of the event, the royal procession from Gameunsaji to the Tomb of King Munmu of Silla was reenacted. And There were flying kites, and performing rituals on the king of Munmu.

Succession 

ROKS Munmu the Great (DDH-976) is the second Destroyer in the South Korean navy. It was named after the king Munmu of Silla. The ship was named after King Munmu of Silla, which is about 500 tons larger than that of Chungmugong Yi Sun-sin-class destroyer.

Gallery

Neighboring cultural assets

Gameunsaji 

 is a Historic Site No. 31. And it is a temple site that was made for Munmu of Silla, who unified Three Kingdoms of Korea and be the dragon of the East Sea. It was discovered that the temple was deployed as a two-board temple in 1959. In the second excavation, it was reconstructed on two occasions after the first one in 1979 and 1980.

Igyeondae 

 is Historic Site No. 159. It is located in front of Gamgeunsa Temple Site, where the tomb of Munmu of Silla, who achieved unification of the Three Kingdoms of Korea, is seen.

See also 
 History of Korea

References 

Burials at sea
Islands of North Gyeongsang Province
Islands of the Sea of Japan
Silla
Buildings and structures in Gyeongju
Tourist attractions in Gyeongju